Samuel Fedida, OBE (4 May 1918 – 2007) was an Egyptian-born British telecommunication engineer responsible at Post Office Telecommunications for the development of Viewdata.

Fedida was born in Alexandria, Egypt. He had the idea for Viewdata in 1968 after reading a publication with the title The Computer as Communications Device. The first prototype became operational in 1974. In 1977 the system was introduced in the United Kingdom. He was appointed an Officer of the Order of the British Empire in the 1980 Birthday Honours.

The book Viewdata Revolution authored by Mr Fedida and Mr Rex Malik, ISBN 0852272146, was published in 1979, and is listed in the main catalogue of The British Library.

References

Sources

1918 births
2007 deaths
British computer scientists
20th-century British inventors
British telecommunications engineers
British Telecom people
History of computing in the United Kingdom
History of telecommunications in the United Kingdom
Officers of the Order of the British Empire
Date of death missing
Place of death missing
People from Alexandria
Egyptian emigrants to the United Kingdom
Egyptian Jews